Green Meadows Park School was established in 2007 by Moulana Hafiz Mohsin Bin Mohammed Al Hamoomi with its first branch in Kishan Bagh Hyderabad.

History
Moulana Hafiz Mohammed Bin Abdur Rahman is the founder, and Moulana Hafiz Hasan Bin Mohammed Alhamoomi is the Director of this school. developing slowly with 30 to 40 students in the first year with one branch and upgrading one class every year the school now has 3 branches. The school started with title Green Meadows Park School and now it became Green Meadows High School. In the starting years, it took admissions in pre-primary and now it is taking admission in primary juniors. With principal  Mrs. Farhat Sultana and correspondent Moulana Hafiz Ahsan Bin Mohammed Al Hamoomi, the school is providing quality education with Islamic studies and complete education in an Islamic atmosphere.

See also
Education in India
List of schools in India

References

External links 

Schools in Hyderabad, India
Islamic schools in India
Educational institutions established in 2007
2007 establishments in Andhra Pradesh